Silvia Borgini (born 22 October 1957) is an Argentine former swimmer. She competed in three events at the 1972 Summer Olympics.

References

1957 births
Living people
Argentine female swimmers
Olympic swimmers of Argentina
Swimmers at the 1972 Summer Olympics
Place of birth missing (living people)